Lengsel was a progressive black metal band that formed in 1994 in Norway. They released one album, called Solace, on Endtime Productions in 2000, which was subsequently licensed to Solid State Records for an American release. The second album The Kiss, the Hope was released in 2007. Their name means "longing" in Norwegian; the idea of longing for home is a prominent theme on their debut release.

History
The group was formed in 1995. They released a self-titled demo in 1997. Shortly after releasing the critically acclaimed debut album Solace in 2000 on 3 labels, the band members took a break from Lengsel. With the same line-up, they formed the band Ganglion, and quickly departed from their black metal roots to a more rock oriented style, alienating many of their old fans and creating a new fan base.

In 1999, guitarist Tor Magne Glidje joined the band Extol on bass. The following year, Glidje switched over to guitar for Extol at the departure of another member and John Mjåland joined the band on bass.  When the guitarist returned, Glidje left Extol, but Mjåland stayed as bassist. In 2004, both of Extol's guitarists left the band and were replaced by Glidje and Ole Sveen, effectively merging both members and music of Ganglion with Extol. Several Ganglion songs, recorded under the Ganglion moniker, were incorporated into the Extol repertoire. Thus, all three members of Lengsel/Ganglion are current members of Extol. The remaining members of Extol also played in Ganglion at one point or another, so the merge was very logical.

In 2006, while Extol was on break, a resurrected Lengsel recorded their second, less positively reviewed full-length album, titled The Kiss, the Hope, and released it on the independent German label Whirlwind Records. It features more of a sludge/hardcore feel than the attitude rock of Ganglion, and has very little in common with Solace.

In 2007, the original members, vocalist Peter Espevoll and drummer David Husvik, decided to end the band and the three remaining members, Sveen, Glidje and Mjåland, decided to start a new band called Mantric.

Band members 
Tor Magne Glidje – guitars, vocals
Ole Halvard Sveen – drums, acoustic guitars, keyboards, vocals
John Robert Mjåland – bass

Discography
Studio albums
Solace (2000)
The Kiss, the Hope (2006)
Lengsel (2011)

Other releases
Lengsel (1997)

References

External links
 Lengsel's Official Myspace Page

Musical groups established in 1995
1995 establishments in Norway
Norwegian unblack metal musical groups
Norwegian progressive metal musical groups
Musical groups from Norway with local place of origin missing 
Solid State Records artists